Deja or Dejah may refer to:

 Deja News, an archive of messages posted to Usenet discussion groups and its successor deja.com
 Andreas Deja (born 1957), German animator
 Dejah Mulipola (born 1998), American softball player
 Dejah Thoris, a fictional character in Edgar Rice Burroughs' Martian novels
 Deja, a village in Sălățig Commune, Sălaj County, Romania
 Deja Monét Trimble, known professionally as Dej Loaf, American rapper, singer and songwriter
 Aurra, an R&B group that also recorded under the name Déjà
 Deja, a 2021 album by Colombian band Bomba Estereo
 Dagnum, a former settlement in Albania
 DeJa Skye, American drag queen

See also
 
 
 Déjà vu (disambiguation)